Alexandra Luke (14 May 1901 - 1 June 1967), born Margaret Alexandra Luke in Montreal, Quebec, was a Canadian abstract artist who belonged to the Painters Eleven.

Early life 
Luke was born in Montreal, one of a pair of twins, to parents Jesse Herbert Ritson Luke and Emma Russell Long. After she had finished high school in 1914, the family settled in Oshawa, Ontario. Soon after, both Alexandra and her twin sister Isobel began nurse's training at Columbia Hospital for Women in Washington, D.C.

After her graduation, Luke returned to Oshawa and married Marcus Everett Smith. Their marriage was short lived, as Smith died suddenly four months into their marriage, but Luke gave birth to his son, Richard, in 1926. Soon after, she was courted by Clarence Ewart McLaughlin, son of George W. McLaughlin and grandson of Robert McLaughlin, the founder of the McLaughlin Carriage Company. The couple married in 1928 and had their first child, Mary, in 1930.

Work and Painters Eleven 

It wasn't until her late 20s that Luke began to create art. Inspired by two local artists, Dorothy Van Luven and Dorothy Henderson, she began to paint and organize arts classes around the city. She helped build the arts community in Oshawa and became a member of several boards and societies, including the Oshawa Women's Lyceum Club and Oshawa Historical Society.

Luke painted landscapes in a large, third floor studio in her and her husband's home and soon discovered abstract art after visiting modernist exhibitions in Toronto and Ottawa. Desperate to be seen as more than a hobbyist painter, she sought out a portfolio review by landscape artist Caven Atkins in 1944. Atkins spoke to her bluntly and told her that her Group of Seven-inspired style was not viable.  This pushed her to further explore abstraction and receive formal art training at the Banff School of Fine Arts (renamed Banff Centre) in 1945, then the Hans Hofmann School of Art in 1947. From Hofmann's teachings, she began to understand how to create energy in her paintings with colour, texture and the use of white space as well as formal structure.

She began to exhibit her work in the early 1950s at different venues, including the Canadian Group of Painters and the Picture Loan Society. In 1952, she organized the first Canadian Abstract Exhibition, where she met many of the members that would form the Painters Eleven. With this group, she was inspired to create more paintings, and she was able to showcase her works in a wide range of venues in the United States and Canada. She championed the promotion of Canadian abstract art and had a "strengthening, inspirational" role in the group.

Later life 

Luke continued to paint and support abstract art until her death from ovarian cancer on 1 June 1967. She had created a sizable volume of work and participated in over 80 group exhibitions and solo shows. She had also been accepted into prestigious arts societies, including the Canadian Group of Painters in 1959 and the Ontario Society of Artists in 1960.

Shortly before her death, Luke and her husband Ewart offered major financial support and works from their own collection toward the creation of a public art gallery for the City of Oshawa. This became The Robert McLaughlin Gallery, named after Ewart's grandfather, in 1967.

Select exhibitions 

 2002: The Alexandra Luke Gallery, Bracebridge (retrospective)
1987: The Robert McLaughlin Gallery, Oshawa (retrospective)
 1977: The Robert McLaughlin Gallery, Oshawa (retrospective)
1969: The Robert McLaughlin Gallery, Oshawa
 1960: Simpson's Baker Galleries, Toronto
1956: Riverside Museum, New York City
 1955: Eglinton Gallery, Toronto
 1953: Martha Jackson Gallery, New York
 1952: Picture Loan Society, Toronto
1947: Riverside Museum, New York City

Select collections 

 National Gallery of Canada, Ottawa
 The Robert McLaughlin Gallery, Oshawa
 Museum London, London, Ontario

References

Bibliography

External links 
 The Canadian Encyclopedia (Alexandra Luke)
 Canadian Women Artists History Initiative (Alexandra Luke)
 Painters Eleven (Alexandra Luke)

1901 births
1967 deaths
Artists from Montreal
Artists from Oshawa
Canadian women painters
Abstract painters
20th-century Canadian painters
20th-century Canadian women artists
Canadian abstract artists
Canadian collage artists